Rodrigo Ariel Izco (born 17 October 1994) is an Argentine professional footballer who plays as a defender for Italian club Bisceglie.

Career

Club
Izco started his senior career with Comunicaciones, after youth spells with Huracán and San Lorenzo. He was selected for his senior debut in November 2013, with manager Jorge Vivaldo choosing him to start a Copa Argentina match with Deportivo Morón; his first appearance in Primera B Metropolitana arrived on 12 February 2014 against Almagro. Overall, Izco made forty-four appearances in his first seasons with Comunicaciones. Primera B Nacional side Ferro Carril Oeste completed the loan signing of Izco on 19 January 2016. He remained with them for the 2016 and 2016–17 campaigns, appearing thirty-two times.

August 2017 saw Izco join Estudiantes on loan. Ten appearances followed, with his final match coming in a 1–0 loss to former team Ferro Carril Oeste on 14 April 2018. Two months later, in June, Izco was loaned by fellow Primera B Nacional side Almagro.

On 25 August 2021, he joined Italian Serie D club Bisceglie.

International
Izco has previously been selected by the Argentina U23s for training, notably in preparation for the 2016 Sait Nagjee Trophy.

Personal life
He is the younger brother of Mariano Julio Izco.

Career statistics
.

References

External links

1994 births
Living people
Footballers from Buenos Aires
Argentine footballers
Association football fullbacks
Club Comunicaciones footballers
Ferro Carril Oeste footballers
Club Sportivo Estudiantes players
Club Almagro players
Nueva Chicago footballers
A.S.D. Licata 1931 players
A.S. Bisceglie Calcio 1913 players
Primera B Metropolitana players
Primera Nacional players
Serie D players
Argentine expatriate footballers
Expatriate footballers in Italy
Argentine expatriate sportspeople in Italy